Ago-Endrik Kerge (also Endrik Kerge; 8 April 1939 Tallinn – 25 April 2021) was an Estonian dancer, ballet master, director and actor.

In 1959 he graduated from Tallinn Choreographic School. In 1976 he graduated from Tallinn State Conservatory Stage Art Department. 1959-1976 (intermittently) he was a ballet soloist at Estonia Theatre. From 1967 until 1969, he was a ballet soloist at Leningrad Music Hall.

From 16 October 2004 to 2005, Ago-Endrik Kerge was an alternate member of the Riigikogu, representing the Res Publica Party.

Kerge was married to ballerina, actress and singer Ülle Ulla from 1962 until their divorce in 1971. Since 1983 he was married to actress Elle Kull.

Awards:
 1967: Meritorious Artist of the Estonian SSR 
 2001: Order of the White Star, V class.

Selected filmography

 1985 Kahe kodu ballaad I jagu (television feature film; director, and role: Priidik)
 1986 Saja aasta pärast mais (feature film; role: Foreign minister Piip)
 1992 Need vanad armastuskirjad (television feature film; role: General)
 1993 Õnne 13 (television series; role: Einar Karmik)
 1995 Wikmani poisid (television series; role: Bishop)
 2019 Klassikokkutulek 3: Ristiisad (feature film; role: Father-in-law)

References

1939 births
2021 deaths
Estonian male ballet dancers
Ballet masters
Estonian male film actors
Estonian male television actors
Estonian male stage actors
20th-century Estonian male actors
21st-century Estonian male actors
Res Publica Party politicians
Members of the Riigikogu, 2003–2007
Estonian Academy of Music and Theatre alumni
Recipients of the Order of the White Star, 5th Class
People from Tallinn
Male actors from Tallinn